Threequarters is used to describe several playing positions in the sports of rugby league and rugby union:

 Threequarters in rugby league football
 Three-quarters in rugby union football

See also
 The fraction (mathematics)  (three quarters)